Juice is a live album from Atlanta, Georgia band The Grapes.  Released August 12, 1997, it was the group's final album.

Credits
Steven Fink: Keyboards, vocals
Ted Norton: Guitar, vocals
Rick Welsh: Drums
Charlie Lonsdorf: Bass, vocals
Brooks Smith: Guitar, vocals

Production credits
Timmy Tappan: Mixing
Ted Norton: Producer
Scott Patton: Producer, Engineer
Ashley Dennis: Engineer
Glenn Schick: Mastering

Track listing
Trouble
Big .45
Dream the Night Away
Stray Cat
Think About It
Sweet Angeline
May It Roll
Junkyard Blues
1/2 Past 10
Year in Hell
Water to Wine
Pick the Lock

The Grapes (band) albums
1997 live albums